Companies with head offices located in Hamilton, Ontario and Area include:
  Hamilton Health Sciences
  Stelco Inc.
  Arcelor Mittal Dofasco Inc.
  National Steel Car
  Hamilton Port Authority
  Orlick Industries Limited
  Robbinex Inc.
  Siemens Canada Ltd.
  Coppley Apparel Group
  Fluke Transportation Group
  Fox 40 International Inc.
  Taylor Steel
  AIC Limited
  Hamilton Specialty Bar Corp.
  John Deere Ltd.
  Horizon Utilities Corporation
  Fortinos Supermarket Limited
  Arcor Windows & Doors
  Nelson Steel
  Oakrun Farm Bakery Ltd.
  E.D. Smith & Sons Ltd.
  Baffin Technology
  Tiercon Industries Inc.
  Stelwire Ltd.
  Turkstra Windows (Industries)
  Regional Die Casting Ltd.
  Stryker Canada
  Lewisfoods Inc.
  Samuel Plate Sales
  Universal Handling Equipment Co. Ltd.
  McKeil Marine Ltd.
  Sobotec Ltd.
  Robertson Building Systems
  Intermetco Ltd.
  Dell Pharmacy
  First Ontario Credit Union
  BDO Dunwoody
  Pioneer Petroleum
  CARSTAR Automotive Canada Inc
  NetAccess Systems Inc
  Clearcable Networks
  Metro Loop
 Hamilton Windows
 McMaster University

References